Guainía (Yuri language: "Land of many waters") is a department of Eastern Colombia. It is in the east of the country, bordering Venezuela and Brazil. Its capital is Inírida. In 1963 Guainía was split off from Vaupés department. The northern part and the Inírida River are included in the Orinoco basin; the rest is part of the Amazon basin. The Guaviare River is the main area of colonization; many colonos come from the Colombian Andean zone, most of them from Boyacá. They are followed by the llaneros, people from the Eastern plains (Llanos). The population is mainly composed of Amerindians, and the largest ethnic groups are the Puinaves (from the makú-puinave family) and the curripacos (from the Arawak family). There are a total of 24 ethnic groups in the department; many of them speak four Indigenous languages besides Spanish and Portuguese.

Municipalities 
There are two municipalities in Guainía: Inírida, its capital, and Barranco Minas. The rest of the territory is subdivided in corregimientos departamentales, a pending figure due to public disorder. This case happens only in Amazonas, Vaupés and Vichada. Barranco Minas is the second biggest population and a municipality since 2019; it is located on the Guaviare River.

The Guainía corregimientos are:
 Cacahual
 La Guadalupe
 Mapiripana
 Morichal Nuevo
 Pana Pana
 Puerto Colombia
 San Felipe

References

External links
  Guainía Secretary of Education
Territorial-Environmental Information System of Colombian Amazon SIAT-AC website 

 
Departments of Colombia
States and territories established in 1963